"By the Waters of Babylon" is a post-apocalyptic short story by American writer Stephen Vincent Benét, first published July 31, 1937, in The Saturday Evening Post as "The Place of the Gods". It was republished in 1943  The Pocket Book of Science Fiction, and was adapted in 1971 into a one-act play by Brainerd Duffield.

Plot summary
Set in a future following the destruction of industrial civilization, the story is narrated by a young man  who is the son of a priest. The priests of John's people (the Hill People) are inquisitive people associated with the divine. They are the only ones who can handle metal collected from the homes (called the "Dead Places") of long-dead people whom they believe to be gods. The plot follows John’s self-assigned mission to get to the Place of the Gods. His father allows him to go on a spiritual journey, not realizing John is going to this forbidden place.

John journeys through the forest for eight days and crosses the river Ou-dis-sun. Once John gets to the Place of the Gods, he feels the energy and magic there. He sees a statue of a "god"—in point of fact, a human—that says "ASHING" on its base. He also sees a building marked "UBTREAS". After being chased by dogs and climbing the stairs of a large building, John sees a dead god. Upon viewing the visage, he has an epiphany that the gods were humans whose power overwhelmed their good judgment. After John returns to his tribe, he tells his father of "the place New York." His father warns him against recounting his experiences to others in the tribe, for sometimes too much truth is a bad thing, that it must be told little by little. The story ends with John stating his conviction that, once he becomes the head priest, "We must build again."

Analysis
Benét wrote the story in response to the April 25, 1937 bombing of Guernica, in which Fascist military forces destroyed the majority of the Basque town of Guernica during the Spanish Civil War. 
This story took place before the public knowledge of nuclear weapons, but Benét's description of "The Great Burning" is similar to later descriptions of the effects of the atomic bombings at Nagasaki and Hiroshima. His "deadly mist" and "fire falling from the sky" seem eerily prescient of the descriptions of the aftermath of nuclear blasts. However, the "deadly mist" may also be a reference to chemical weapons in World War I, particularly mustard gas, a feared weapon of war that Benét's generation was very familiar with. The story was written in 1937, five years before the Manhattan Project started, and eight years before there was widespread public knowledge of the project.

Influence on later work 

Ayn Rand's 1937 novella Anthem may have been inspired by this story.

In 1955 Edgar Pangborn wrote "The Music Master of Babylon", a post-apocalyptic story told from the point of view of a pianist living alone in a ruined New York City, and after decades of total isolation encountering two youths from a new culture which had arisen in the world, who come exploring the ruined city. Pangborn depicted a different world than that of Benét, but referred to Benét's story in the title and in many of the story's details. Pangborn returned to that devastated world in his later writings, including the novel Davy.

See also

 Anthem (novella)
 List of apocalyptic and post-apocalyptic fiction
 The title is a reference to Psalm 137 in the Bible.
 Rivers of Babylon (disambiguation)

Notes

Sources

(WorldCat) (preview)

 (about the author)
Macdonald, Andrew, Gina Macdonald, and MaryAnn Sheridan. (2000). Shape-shifting: images of Native Americans in recent popular fiction. Contributions to the study of popular culture, no. 71. Westport, Conn, Greenwood Press. .

External links
 

American short stories
1937 short stories
Post-apocalyptic short stories
Works originally published in The Saturday Evening Post